Sturton by Stow is a village and civil parish in the West Lindsey district of Lincolnshire, England. The population of the civil parish was 1,369 at the 2011 census.

The village is situated on the north-south B1241 and east–west A1500 Tillbridge Road (a Roman road). Nearby to the north is Stow. Sturton falls within the ecclesiastical parish of Stow, consequently the parish church of Sturton is Stow Minster.  The Church of England maintains a mission church in Sturton, a brick building dedicated to St Hugh and designed by John Loughborough Pearson.

The Sturton by Stow Secondary Modern School closed in the 1980s. There is a primary school on School Lane. The village public house is the Plough Inn on Tillbridge Road.

References

External links

 Village website
 Stow Group of Churches
 Primary school

Further reading

Civil parishes in Lincolnshire
Villages in Lincolnshire
West Lindsey District